The tricolored grebe (Tachybaptus tricolor) is a bird in the family Podicipedidae sometimes considered conspecific with the little grebe (Tachybaptus ruficollis). It is native to maritime Southeast Asia and Australasia. The IOC has split the bird; however, other taxonomic authorities still consider the birds conspecific.

Systematics
The following subspecies are considered to be part of the tricolor group:

Tachybaptus  ruficollis vulcanorum (Rensch, 1929): Sulawesi, North Maluku to New Guinea
Tachybaptus  ruficollis tricolor (Gray, 1861): Java, Timor, Lesser Sundas, northeast New Guinea to Bougainville Island.
Tachybaptus ruficollis collaris (Mayr, 1945): Solomon Islands

References

Podicipedidae
Tachybaptus
Birds described in 1861
Taxa named by George Robert Gray